AEU is the Australian Education Union, a current trade union in Australia.

AEU may also refer to:
 Akeu language
 Album-equivalent unit, a measurement unit equivalent the purchase of one album copy in the music industry
 Amalgamated Engineering Union, a former trade union in Great Britain
 Amalgamated Engineering Union (Australia), a former Australian trade union
 American Ethical Union
 Advanced European Union, a fictional body of Mobile Suit Gundam 00 characters